Alan Whitney Brown (born July 8, 1952) is an American actor, comedian, and writer. Brown is best known for his tenure as a writer and cast member on the NBC sketch comedy series Saturday Night Live from 1985 to 1991. In addition to writing for the program, he appeared opposite Dennis Miller in a biting satirical Weekend Update commentary segment called "The Big Picture". He won a 1988 Emmy Award for Outstanding Writing in a Variety or Music Program, along with Al Franken, Tom Davis, Phil Hartman, Mike Myers, Lorne Michaels and Conan O'Brien. He was also one of the original correspondents on Comedy Central's The Daily Show from 1996 to 1998.

Career
Brown began his career as a street juggler, and he became a stand-up comedian after entering the 1977 San Francisco Comedy Competition. He became a member of the Writer's Guild when he was hired by Lorne Michaels to join the writing staff of Saturday Night Live in 1985; he was also a featured performer. He left for personal reasons six years later. He worked briefly for the liberal radio network Air America Radio during its start-up period in early 2004 and remains active in online political discourse.

He also wrote the screenplay for an episode of HBO's horror anthology show Tales From the Crypt named "Collection Completed" (Season 1, Episode 6; first aired in America on June 28, 1989).

Personal life
On March 4, 2011, Brown married Carolyn Wonderland, a blues singer and guitarist, in Austin, Texas.  The marriage was officiated by Michael Nesmith of The Monkees. Brown was previously married to Cynthia Swanson, a New York newspaper designer, from 1976 to 2011. Through this prior marriage, Brown has a daughter, Serena, and a granddaughter, Thea Lenore.

Works
The Big Picture: An American Commentary. HarperCollins, 1991.

References

External links

Blog at Daily Kos

1952 births
Living people
American satirists
American sketch comedians
American stand-up comedians
American television writers
American male television writers
Primetime Emmy Award winners
People from Charlotte, Michigan
20th-century American comedians
21st-century American comedians
Comedians from Michigan
Screenwriters from Michigan